Fiama Di Wills is an Indian personal care brand that offers shampoos, conditioner, bathing bars and shower gels. It is owned by ITC Limited, an Indian conglomerate with a market capitalization of US$40 billion and a turnover of $8 billion.

Launched on 15 September 2007, the brand was the second to roll out of ITC's personal care stable.

References

Indian brands
Personal care brands
Companies based in Kolkata
2007 establishments in West Bengal
ITC Limited